Adelaide United Football Club, a professional association football club based in Hindmarsh, Adelaide. The club was founded in September 2003 as they competed in the final season of the National Soccer League (NSL) as they replaced Adelaide City FC in the league. In October 2004, they announced their team to compete in the A-League which was the replacement for the NSL.

The first season of the new league saw the club win the minor premiership before losing to Central Coast Mariners FC in the preliminary final.

Key
Key to league competitions:

 A-League – Australia's top soccer league, established in 2005
 NSL – The first tier of Australian football until the inception of the A-League in 2005.

Key to colours and symbols:

Key to league record:
 Season = The year and article of the season
 Pos = Final position
 Pld = Games played
 W = Games won
 D = Games drawn
 L = Games lost
 GF = Goals scored
 GA = Goals against
 Pts = Points

Key to cup record:
 En-dash (–) = Adelaide United did not participate
 R32 = Round of 32
 R16 = Round of 16
 QF = Quarter-finals
 SF = Semi-finals
 RU = Runners-up
 W = Winners

Seasons

Notes

References

 aleaguestats.com

Adelaide United FC seasons
Adelaide United FC
A